Gimik 2010 is a Philippine television series on ABS-CBN as part of Your Song weekly series. It is a reintroduction of the 1990s series Gimik.

Cast and characters

Main cast (Season 1: The Reunion) 
Judy Ann Santos as Dianne Villaruel
Diether Ocampo as Gregorio "Gary" Ballesteros
Giselle Toengi as Angelina "Gina" de Leon-Ballesteros
Mylene Dizon as Melanie Suntay-Lorenzo
Bojo Molina as Brian Lorenzo

Main cast (Season 2: The Beginnings) 
Jessy Mendiola as Jessy Lorenzo, daughter of Brian's cousin.  Originally from Cebu she moved to Manila for a fresh start. She once fell in love with Franco and rebelled against her parents.  She had a letter "F" tattooed above her behind to show her love for Franco.  The two of them once thought of eloping but Jessy walked in on Franco with another girl in his hotel room.
Lance Christopher as Lance Marquez
Franco Daza as Franco Zubiri
Jaco Benin as Jaco
Kenji Shirakawa as Kenji
Kazuo Nawa as Kazuo
Hanna Flores as Hanna
Janeena Chan as Janeena
Albie Casiño as Albie Marquez
Vangie Martelle as Vangie
Daniel Padilla as Daniel Ledesma
Julia Montes as Mara (credited as Mara Montes) 
Arie Reyes as Arie
Marlann Flores sa Marlann

Supporting cast 
Will Devaughn as Raymond Salvador
Dimples Romana as Bingbing
Andre Tiangco as Robert Lorenzo- Jessy's dad
Fred Payawan as Gab
Mico Palanca as Eugene
Xyriel Manabat as Gracy Ledesma

See also
 Gimik

References 

ABS-CBN original programming
Philippine teen drama television series
2010 Philippine television series debuts
2010 Philippine television series endings
Filipino-language television shows
Television shows set in Manila